Arnau may refer to:

Places 
Arnau Church of St. Catherine of Alexandria, a medieval church in Arnau (modern Rodniki) east of Kaliningrad
German name for Hostinné, a town in the Czech Republic
University Hospital Arnau de Vilanova, a public medical institution in Lleida, Catalonia, Spain
German name for

Given name 
 Arnau, Catalan given name equivalent to Arnold
Arnau Amalric (died 1225), Cistercian church leader who took a prominent role in the Albigensian Crusade
Arnau Bassa (died 1348), Catalan painter of the 14th century
Arnau Brugués-Davi (born 1985), professional tennis player from Spain
Arnau Cadell (12th-century–13th-century), Catalan sculptor
Arnau de Gurb, bishop of Barcelona from 1252 to 1284
Arnau Mir, Count of Pallars Jussà (died 1174), the Count of Pallars Jussà from 1124/6 until his death
Arnau Ramon of Pallars Jussà (died 1112), Count of Pallars Jussà from 1098 until his death
Arnau March (fl. c. 1410–30), Provenço-Catalan knight and poet of the famous March family
Arnau de Palomar, the first lord of Riudoms in Southern Catalonia near the current city of Reus
Arnau of Peralta (died 1271), Bishop of Valencia 1243–1248, then Bishop of Zaragoza until his death
Arnau Riera (born 1981), Spanish footballer
Arnau Mir de Tost (died 1072), Catalan nobleman of Urgell, the lord of Llordà and viscount of Àger
Arnau de Vilanova (1235–1311), alchemist, astrologer and physician

Surname 
Ana Arnau (born 2005), Spanish rhythmic gymnast 
B. J. Arnau (1945–1989), American-born female singer and actor
Comte Arnau, wealthy Catalan nobleman
Emanuele Canoura Arnau (1887–1934), member of the Passionist Congregation and a martyr of the Asturias revolt
Francesc Arnau (1975–2021), Catalan Spanish footballer
Frank Arnau (1894–1976), pseudonym of a German crime fiction writer, born as Heinrich Schmitt
Xavier Arnau (born 1973), former field hockey player from Catalonia, Spain
Jordi Arnau (born 1970), former field hockey player from Catalonia, Spain
Lucas Arnau (born 1979), awarded Shock Magazine's Best Colombian Pop Artist on September 21, 2007
Narcís Jubany Arnau (1913–1996), Spanish Cardinal of the Roman Catholic Church
Juan Arnau (born 1968), Valencian Spanish philosopher and essayist

See also
Anau (disambiguation)
Arau
Arna (disambiguation)
Arnaud (disambiguation)
Arnault
Arnauts
 Arnold (disambiguation)